|}

The Prix Morny is a Group 1 flat horse race in France open to two-year-old thoroughbred colts and fillies. It is run at Deauville over a distance of 1,200 metres (about 6 furlongs), and it is scheduled to take place each year in August.

History
The event is named in memory of Auguste de Morny (1811–1865), the founder of Deauville Racecourse. It was established in 1865, and it was originally called the Prix de Morny. The inaugural race was over 1,000 metres, and the prize for the winning owner was 9,150 francs.

The second and third runnings of the Prix de Morny were contested over 1,200 metres. It was extended to 1,300 metres in 1868, and to 1,400 metres in 1870.

The race became known as the Prix de Deux Ans in 1871, and its distance was cut to 1,200 metres in 1887. It was renamed the Prix Morny, a shortened version of its original title, in 1911.

The Prix Morny was abandoned from 1914 to 1918, and again in 1940. Its usual venue was closed during World War II, so it was held temporarily at Longchamp (1941–42, 1944) and Maisons-Laffitte (1943, 1945). The first two editions at Longchamp were run over 1,000 metres, and the 1944 running was contested over 1,300 metres.

The event opened to foreign horses in 1947, and that year's race was won by a British colt named Delirium. An earlier spell as an international race (1875 to 1908) had yielded no foreign winners.

Records
Leading jockey (10 wins):
 George Stern – Eperon (1900), Farnus (1901), Vinicius (1902), Val d'Or (1904), Mehari (1908), Porte Maillot (1911), Marka (1912), Durzetta (1920), Zariba (1921), Banstar (1925)

Leading trainer (8 wins):
 Robert Denman – Present Times (1884), Frapotel (1886), Farnus (1901), Vinicius (1902), Val d'Or (1904), Mehari (1908), Porte Maillot (1911), Marka (1912)

Leading owner (13 wins):
 Marcel Boussac – Durzetta (1920), Zariba (1921), Banstar (1925), Cecias (1932), Corrida (1934), Semiramide (1938), Esmeralda (1941), Coaraze (1944), Nirgal (1945), Cadir (1946), Auriban (1951), Cordova (1953), Apollonia (1955)

Winners since 1968

Earlier winners

 1865: Puebla
 1866: Le Petit Caporal
 1867: Marcello
 1868: Masaniello
 1869: Roquefort
 1870: Eole
 1871: Seul
 1872: Flageolet
 1873: Perla
 1874: Macaron
 1875: Fusion
 1876: Astree
 1877: Mantille
 1878: Swift
 1879: Louis d'Or
 1880: Strelitz
 1881: Favorite
 1882: Chitre
 1883: Directrice
 1884: Present Times
 1885: Alger
 1886: Frapotel
 1887: Widgeon
 1888: Fontanas
 1889: Cromatella
 1890: Zingaro
 1891: Ranes
 1892: Marly
 1893: Fresca
 1894: Le Sagittaire
 1895: Daphnis
 1896: Indian Chief
 1897: Washington
 1898: Justitia
 1899: Lucie
 1900: Eperon
 1901: Farnus
 1902: Vinicius
 1903: Theleme
 1904: Val d'Or
 1905: Prestige
 1906: Sagamore
 1907: Valda
 1908: Mehari
 1909: Messidor
 1910: Manfred
 1911: Porte Maillot
 1912: Marka
 1913: Sardanapale
 1914–18: no race
 1919: Sourbier
 1920: Durzetta
 1921: Zariba
 1922: Mackenzie
 1923: Golden Hope
 1924: La Habanera
 1925: Banstar
 1926: Fairy Legend
 1927: Kantar
 1928: Necklace
 1929: Chateau Bouscaut
 1930: Pearl Cap
 1931: Eadhild
 1932: Cecias
 1933: Brantôme
 1934: Corrida
 1935: Mistress Ford
 1936: Tizona
 1937: Ad Astra
 1938: Semiramide
 1939: Furane
 1940: no race
 1941: Esmeralda
 1942: Fanatique
 1943: Sampiero
 1944: Coaraze
 1945: Nirgal
 1946: Cadir
 1947: Delirium
 1948: Amour Drake
 1949: Ksarinor
 1950: Sanguine
 1951: Auriban
 1952: Bozet
 1953: Cordova
 1954: Chingacgook
 1955: Apollonia
 1956: Mr Pickwick
 1957: Neptune
 1958: Oceanic
 1959: Pharamond
 1960: Solitude
 1961: Prudent
 1962: Darannour
 1963: Revoquee
 1964: Grey Dawn
 1965: Soleil
 1966: Le Conquerant
 1967: Madina

See also
 List of French flat horse races
 Recurring sporting events established in 1865  – this race is included under its original title, Prix de Morny.

References

 France Galop / Racing Post:
 galop.courses-france.com:
 1865–1889, 1890–1919, 1920–1949, 1950–1979, 1980–present

 france-galop.com – A Brief History: Prix Morny.
 galopp-sieger.de – Prix Morny (ex Prix de Deux Ans).
 horseracingintfed.com – International Federation of Horseracing Authorities – Prix Morny (2018).
 pedigreequery.com – Prix Morny – Deauville.

Flat horse races for two-year-olds
Deauville-La Touques Racecourse
Horse races in France
Recurring sporting events established in 1865
1865 establishments in France